Paolo Baiocco (born 29 June 1989) is an Italian professional footballer who plays as a goalkeeper.

Club career
On 27 July 2019, he signed with Paganese.

On 22 September 2020 he joined Perugia. His Perugia contract was terminated by mutual consent on 1 February 2021.

On 9 February 2021, he returned to Paganese.

References

1989 births
Footballers from Rome
Living people
Italian footballers
Atletico Roma F.C. players
U.S. Siracusa players
Reggina 1914 players
Benevento Calcio players
Matera Calcio players
F.C. Grosseto S.S.D. players
S.S. Arezzo players
S.S. Racing Club Fondi players
Delfino Pescara 1936 players
U.S. Livorno 1915 players
Paganese Calcio 1926 players
A.C. Perugia Calcio players
Serie B players
Serie C players
Association football goalkeepers